Apulia and Calabria may refer to:

 Province of Apulia and Calabria, Roman
 County of Apulia and Calabria, medieval
 Duchy of Apulia and Calabria, medieval